Sigurvin Ólafsson may refer to:
 Sigurvin Ólafsson (footballer, born 1942), Icelandic footballer
 Sigurvin Ólafsson (footballer, born 1976), Icelandic footballer